"Pilot of the Airwaves" is a song by English singer-songwriter Charlie Dore. It was released as a single in 1979 from her album Where to Now.

The song reached number 13 on the Billboard Hot 100, and earned her the Record World New Female Artist of the Year, and an ASCAP award. The single also charted in Canada, Australia, and Europe.

Content
The lyrics are from the point of view of a woman who frequently listens, late at night, to a radio disc jockey whom she calls a "pilot of the airwaves," keeping what has often been called the "dawn patrol." She admits that she has few real-life friends and that the DJ keeps her as much company as she believes she needs, describing her life and the feelings she has surrounding the fact that she considers the radio DJ her only true friend. The DJ does not need to play the selection she has requested; she does hope the DJ will do his best along those lines, adding:

I've been listening to your show on the radio,And you seem like a friend to me.

In History
On 5 November 1990, "Pilot of the Airwaves" was the final track played by Radio Caroline as an unlicensed offshore radio station.

Chart performance

Weekly singles charts

Year-end charts

Cover Versions
French singer Sheila recorded a French cover version, entitled "Pilote sur les ondes", in 1980.
Ingrid Peters recorded a German cover version, entitled "Weißt Du Wo Du Hingehst", in 1980.

See also
List of one-hit wonders in the United States

References

1979 songs
1979 singles
Island Records singles
Songs written by Charlie Dore
Songs about radio
Song recordings produced by Alan Tarney